Clarkson railway station may refer to:

Clarkson railway station, Perth, Western Australia
Clarkson GO Station, Mississauga, Ontario, Canada